Slaughter is a surname.

Notable people having this surname include:

 Anne-Marie Slaughter (born 1958), President and CEO of New America, Former Dean of the Woodrow Wilson School of Public and International Affairs at Princeton University 
 Carolyn Slaughter (born 1946), writer
 Christopher Columbus Slaughter (1837–1919), American rancher, cattle drover and breeder, banker and philanthropist in the Old West
 Enos Slaughter (1916–2002), Hall of Fame baseball player
 Fenton M. Slaughter (1826–1897), American politician
 Frank G. Slaughter (1908–2001), novelist
 Fred Slaughter (1942–2016), American basketball player and sports agent
 Gabriel Slaughter (1767–1830), American politician, Governor of Kentucky
 George Webb Slaughter (1811–1895), American Baptist minister, cattle breeder and drover, and rancher in Texas
 James E. Slaughter (1813–1900), American Army lieutenant
 Jim Slaughter (1928–1999), American professional basketball player
 John Horton Slaughter (1841–1922), American lawman
 Julia Cornelia Slaughter (1850–1905), American artist
 Karin Slaughter (born 1971), writer
 Louise Slaughter (1929–2018), American politician
 Marcus Slaughter (born 1985), basketball player
 Mark Slaughter (born 1964), lead singer of Slaughter (band)
 Nugent Slaughter (1888–1968), special effects designer
 Rebecca Slaughter (born c. 1983), acting chair of the Federal Trade Commission
 Samuel Slaughter (1848–1910), American businessman; Washington state pioneer and politician
 Sean Slaughter (born 1976), American Christian hip hop musician
 Susan Slaughter, American orchestral trumpet player
 Tracey Slaughter (born 1972), New Zealand writer and poet
 Walter Slaughter (1860–1908), composer
 Webster Slaughter (born 1964) American football player
 William B. Slaughter (politician) (1797–1879), American politician
 William B. Slaughter (rancher) (1852–1929), American rancher

See also
 Slaughter (disambiguation)
 Sgt. Slaughter (born 1948), stage name of Robert Rudolph Remus, a pro wrestler

English-language surnames